Kara S. Hultgreen (October 5, 1965 – October 25, 1994) was an American naval aviator who served as a lieutenant in the United States Navy and was the first female carrier-based fighter pilot in the U.S. Navy. She was also the first female fighter pilot in the U.S. military to die in a crash.

Early life 
Hultgreen was born on October 5, 1965, in Greenwich, Connecticut, the granddaughter of Norwegian immigrants on her father's side. She was raised in both Chicago and Toronto, then San Antonio from 1981 on. She attended Alamo Heights High School and received a congressional nomination to the United States Naval Academy but did not get an appointment. She graduated in 1987 from the University of Texas at Austin, where she majored in aerospace engineering.

Military career
Hultgreen was commissioned through the Aviation Officer Candidate School at Naval Air Station Pensacola, where she was a Distinguished Naval Graduate.

Upon graduation she was assigned to Training Air Wing 4 at Naval Air Station Corpus Christi, Texas, for primary flight training with VT-27 in the T-34C Turbomentor. Screened for the Strike Pilot training pipeline, she underwent follow-on training in the T-2C Buckeye and TA-4J Skyhawk II with Training Air Wing 3 at NAS Chase Field, Texas.

Following designation as a naval aviator, she received orders to fly EA-6A Prowlers with Tactical Electronic Warfare Squadron 33 (VAQ-33) at NAS Key West, Florida. Upon the Navy's integration of women in combat, Lt. Hultgreen was selected in May 1993 to be among the first female pilots to undergo F-14 Tomcat training at NAS Miramar, California.

While with Pacific Fleet F-14 Fleet Replacement Squadron, Fighter Squadron 124 (VF-124), Hultgreen failed her first attempt at carrier qualification, but she successfully carrier-qualified at the end of July 1994 during a second period aboard , becoming the first "combat qualified" female naval aviator. Upon completion of the VF-124 Category I fleet replacement pilot syllabus, she was assigned to the Black Lions of Fighter Squadron 213 (VF-213) and began preparations for deployment to the Persian Gulf.

Her call signs were "Hulk" or "She-Hulk", for her ability to bench press , her  frame, and a play on her surname. Following a television appearance in which she wore noticeable makeup, she received the additional call sign of "Revlon".

Death

Hultgreen was the first female fighter pilot in the U.S. military to die in a crash. The incident occurred off the coast of San Diego after a routine training mission. Finding herself overshooting the landing area centerline, Hultgreen attempted to correct her approach by applying left rudder pedal, which caused the nose to disrupt the airflow over the left (inside) wing, as well as the airflow to the left engine intake. The port engine suffered a compressor stall and lost power—a well-known deficiency characteristic of the F-14A's TF30-P-414A engine when inlet air is no longer flowing straight into it. For this reason, the F-14 NATOPS flight manual warned against excess yaw. Loss of an F-14 engine results in asymmetric thrust, which can exceed rudder authority (the degree of control exerted over the aircraft), especially at low speeds.

After aborting the approach, Hultgreen selected full afterburner on the remaining engine, causing an even greater asymmetry. This, combined with a high angle of attack, caused an unrecoverable approach turn stall and rapid wing drop to the left. The radar intercept officer in the rear seat, Lt. Matthew Klemish, initiated ejection for himself and Hultgreen as soon as it was apparent the aircraft was becoming uncontrollable. First in the automated ejection sequence, Klemish survived. However, by the time Hultgreen's seat fired 0.4 seconds later, the plane had exceeded 90 degrees of roll, and she was ejected downward into the water, killing her instantly.

On November 21, she was buried at Arlington National Cemetery, with full military honors.

The F-14A lost in the crash, BuNo 160390, had been one of the two involved in the Gulf of Sidra incident of 1981, when it was previously assigned to Fighter Squadron 41 (VFA-41) at NAS Oceana, Virginia, and embarked with Carrier Air Wing Eight (CVW-8) aboard .

As with most approaches to a carrier landing, Hultgreen's incident was videotaped by two cameras. The tape shows an overshooting turn onto final, then apparent engine failure, followed by an audible wave-off and gear-up command from the landing signal officer. Segments shown on broadcast television concluded with the rapid sequence of aircraft stall, roll, crew ejections, and impact with the water.

Accusations of unqualification
Hultgreen's death has been used by activists who believe the Navy has put political considerations ahead of safety and morale concerns and who oppose women flying combat aircraft. Elaine Donnelly of the Center for Military Readiness suggested that Hultgreen "may have been the victim of a flawed policy" that overlooked her mistakes in training, two of which were similar to those that caused her death, and that Hultgreen and her fellow promoted female pilot, Carey Dunai Lohrenz, were repeatedly continued through training despite unusually low scores and mistakes that would have washed out male trainees. Lohrenz subsequently brought a suit for defamation against the CMR but lost because the court determined that, by virtue of her status as one of the first women to attempt to qualify as a carrier combat pilot, she was a "public figure" and had to prove malice on the part of those who published the charge of favoritism. She appealed, but her appeal was denied with a statement that "Our conclusion about Lt. Lohrenz's public figure status does not suggest that she was not a good Naval aviator trying to do her job, and it does not penalize her for acting with 'professionalism.'"

According to an Accuracy in Media article, three Navy flight instructors alleged that Commander Tom Sobiek, the commanding officer of Fighter Squadron VF-124, said of the four female pilots in his squadron, "The women are going to graduate regardless of how they performed" and "the Navy was in a race with the Air Force to get the first female fighter pilot". It quotes Sobiek denying making any such statement: "That is a flat [ass] lie," he said. "And whoever told you that, if they were under oath, should be taken to task."

A fellow F-14 pilot, Francesco "Paco" Chierici,  would later say that "the treatment [Hultgreen] received after her death has always stayed with me as one of the greatest injustices witnessed during my naval career," and that her squadron's executive officer crashed in a flight simulator 97 percent of the time when faced with similar problems.

See also

 Modern United States Navy carrier air operations
 Dagny Hultgreen (sister)

References

External links 
 The Real Truth About Kara Hultgreen's F-14 Tomcat Mishap by Ward Carroll (May 18, 2021)

Further reading

1965 births
1994 deaths
Burials at Arlington National Cemetery
Military personnel from Chicago
People from Greenwich, Connecticut
Military personnel from San Antonio
Female United States Navy officers
Aviators killed in aviation accidents or incidents in the United States
Accidents and incidents involving United States Navy and Marine Corps aircraft
Women United States Naval Aviators
Victims of aviation accidents or incidents in 1994
20th-century American women
20th-century American people